Oxford International School (OIS) is an international school in Panama City, Panama, serving students from preschool through high school. As of 2015 it had about 100 employees and 1,010 students. The campus is located on Via España.

References

External links

 Oxford International School

International schools in Panama
Panama City